The University of Manitoba Hemp Awareness Committee (UMHAC) was founded by Martin Moravcik, Meera Sarin, Wayne Potoroka and Gil Maguet. Manitoba Hemp Alliance (MHA) lobbied government officials and organized support for hemp. The MHA also convinced the Manitoba government to permit the first scientific research into hemp in Manitoba after its 50-year ban.

References

University of Manitoba
Cannabis in Manitoba
Hemp